Anthidiellum butarsis is a species of leaf-cutting bee in the genus Anthidiellum, of the family Megachilidae.

References
 http://www.atlashymenoptera.net/biblio/Karunaratne_et_al_2006_Sri_Lanka.pdf
 https://www.itis.gov/servlet/SingleRpt/SingleRpt?search_topic=TSN&search_value=755649
 https://www.academia.edu/7390502/AN_UPDATED_CHECKLIST_OF_BEES_OF_SRI_LANKA_WITH_NEW_RECORDS
 http://animaldiversity.org/accounts/Anthidiellum_butarsis/classification/

Megachilidae
Insects described in 2001